Jan Černý-Nigranus (1500 or 1510 – 5 February 1565) was a Czech historian, preacher and bishop of the Moravian Church.

Life
He was born in Kunvald. In 1537 he was ordained bishop and worked in the congregation of Moravian Church in Brandýs nad Labem. During the persecution against the followers of the "Czech brothers" he escaped to Prague. He died in Mladá Boleslav.

Works
Acta Unitatis Fratrum (Akta Jednoty bratrské)
Poznamenání některých skutků Božích obzvláštních

16th-century births
1565 deaths
People from Ústí nad Orlicí District
Czech bishops
16th-century Bohemian historians
Czech Protestant clergy
Czech people of the Moravian Church